Dinas Rhondda railway station is a railway station serving the Dinas, Penygraig and Trealaw districts of Tonypandy, Wales. It is located on the Rhondda Line.

The station has one platform with one small station shelter and is accessible by a small connector road. There is evidence of a previous platform, which originally served North bound trains to Treherbert, but this was left abandoned after rationalisation in 1982, which saw the removal of the northbound line. Today the platform is heavily overgrown. It has a car park, even though it is one of the smaller stations on the line.

Services
Monday-Saturday, there is a half-hourly service to  southbound and to  northbound.  This drops to hourly in the evenings and two-hourly in each direction on Sundays. On 20 July 2018, previous franchise operator Arriva Trains Wales announced a trial period of extra Sunday services on the Rhondda Line to Cardiff and Barry Island. This was in response to a survey by Leanne Wood and the success of extra Sunday services on the Merthyr Line and the Rhymney Line.

References

External links

Railway stations in Rhondda Cynon Taf
DfT Category F1 stations
Former Taff Vale Railway stations
Railway stations served by Transport for Wales Rail
Railway stations in Great Britain opened in 1886
Railway stations in Great Britain closed in 1917
Railway stations in Great Britain opened in 1919